Kim Ga-young (born 13 January 1983 in Seoul; sometimes referred to in the Western media as Ga-young Kim and nicknamed "Little Devil Girl") is a South Korean female professional pool player who plays on the Women's Professional Billiard Association  Tour. Her father began teaching her to play three-cushion billiards (a form of carom billiards) when she was about twelve years old. After playing three-cushion for about three years, she started playing nine-ball pool and turned pro at the 2003 BCA Open.

Kim practices about 30 hours a week and enjoys a friendly rivalry with fellow Asian WPBA player Pan Xiaoting of China. Kim and Pan met in the finals of the 2007 Carolina Women's Billiard Classic, with Kim prevailing 7–6 in the WPBA's first all-Asian championship match. Kim and Pan finished the 2007 WPBA season ranked 2nd and 3rd, respectively, behind perennially top-ranked Allison Fisher. Kim speaks Mandarin Chinese in addition to her native Korean language.

Titles 
 2004 WPBA U.S. Open Nine-ball Championship
 2004 WPA Women's World Nine-ball Championship
 2005 Tournament of Champions
 2006 WPA Amway Cup 9-Ball World Open
 2006 WPA Women's World Nine-ball Championship
 2007 WPBA Carolina Classic
 2009 WPBA U.S. Open Nine-ball Championship
 2009 WPBA Colorado Classic
 2009 East Asian Games Nine-Ball Singles
 2010 WPBA U.S. Open Nine-ball Championship
 2010 Tournament of Champions
 2010 Billiards Digest Player of the Year
 2011 WPA Amway Cup 9-Ball World Open
 2011 WPBA Tour Championships
 2011 Tournament of Champions
 2012 WPA Women's World Ten-ball Championship
 2012 Tournament of Champions
 2013 Ultimate 10-Ball Championships Women's Champion
 2013 WPBA Masters
 2014 WPBA Masters
 2014 Billiards Digest Player of the Year
 2015 China Open 9-Ball Championship
 2015 All Japan Championship 9-Ball
 2015 Tournament of Champions
 2015 Tornado Open 9-Ball
 2015 Billiards Digest Player of the Year
 2016 WPBA U.S. Open Nine-ball Championship
 2018 WPBA Grand Slam 9-Ball
 2019 World Team Trophy Women's 9-Ball

References

External links 
 Player Profile in Women's Professional Billiards Association
 Official Fans Facebook Page

1983 births
Living people
Female pool players
South Korean pool players
World champions in pool
Asian Games medalists in cue sports
Asian Games silver medalists for South Korea
Medalists at the 2006 Asian Games
Medalists at the 2010 Asian Games
Cue sports players at the 2010 Asian Games
Cue sports players at the 2006 Asian Games
World Games silver medalists
Competitors at the 2013 World Games
Competitors at the 2017 World Games
South Korean expatriate sportspeople in Taiwan